Komorniki  is a village in Poland, located in Greater Poland Voivodeship, Poznań County, Gmina Komorniki (Poznań metropolitan area), with approximately 5,500 inhabitants. The gmina (municipality) of Komorniki, including the village of Komorniki and 10 other villages, has about 18,325 inhabitants and is an agricultural and industrial region. (See Gmina Komorniki.) Komorniki adjoins Poznań, Luboń, Plewiska, and the Wielkopolska National Park.

The village is famous for its Komorniki Festival of Organ and Chamber Music.

The Polish Baroque Orchestra society has its registered office in Komorniki.

Culture 
 Komorniki Festival of Organ and Chamber Music
 Polish Baroque Orchestra

References

External links

 Official website Gmina Komorniki
 Komorniki Festival of Organ and Chamber Music
 Polish Baroque Orchestra

Villages in Poznań County